Ripley County is a county located at the southeastern corner of the U.S. state of Indiana. According to the 2010 Census, the population was 28,818. The county seat is Versailles.

History
Ripley County was formed on December 27, 1816, in the same legislative act that created Jennings County. It was named for Gen. Eleazer Wheelock Ripley, an officer in the War of 1812, who figured in the Battle of Lundy's Lane and the Siege of Fort Erie during 1814.

Geography
The county seat of Ripley County is Versailles, Indiana. It was selected as the county seat in 1818, and was laid out in 1819.

Unincorporated towns

 Allen Crossing
 Ballstown
 Behlmer Corner
 Benham
 Clinton
 Correct
 Cross Plains
 Cross Roads
 Dabney
 Delaware
 Dewberry
 Elrod
 Friendship
 Haney Corner
 Jackson
 Jolleyville
 Laugheryville
 Lookout
 Morris
 Negangards Corner
 New Carrollton
 New Marion
 Old Milan
 Olean
 Otter Village
 Penntown
 Pierceville
 Prattsburg
 Rexville
 Spades
 Stringtown
 Stumpke Corner

Ghost towns
 Saint Magdalen

Adjacent counties
 Dearborn County  (east)
 Decatur County (northwest)
 Franklin County  (north)
 Jefferson County (south)
 Jennings County (west)
 Ohio County  (east–southeast)
 Switzerland County  (at southeast tip)

Major highways
  Interstate 74 – runs east–west across northern tip of county.
  US Route 50 – runs east–west across middle of county, through Holton and Versailles.
  US Route 421 - enters from Decatur County near northwest tip of Ripley County. Runs SSE to Versailles, then SSW into Jefferson County.
  State Road 46 – runs east–west across northern tip of county, paralleling Interstate 74 on its south side.
  State Road 48 – runs east–west across upper portion of county, through Napoleon.
  State Road 62 – begins at intersection with State Road 129, north of Cross Plains. Runs east through Friendship to Dearborn County.
  State Road 101 – begins at intersection with US Route 50 near east county line. Runs north to Penntown.
  State Road 129 – begins at intersection with State Road 46 east of Batesville, runs south to Versailles, then SSE through Cross Plains into Switzerland County.
  State Road 229 – enters from Franklin County at Batesville, runs SSW to Ballstown then south and west to Napoleon. Runs west to Decatur County.
  State Road 350 – begins at intersection with US 421 at Osgood, runs east through Delaware and Pierceville into Dearborn County.

National protected area
 Big Oaks National Wildlife Refuge (part)

Climate and weather

Government

The county government is a constitutional body, and is granted specific powers by the Constitution of Indiana, and by the Indiana Code.

County Council: The county council is the legislative branch of the county government and controls all the spending and revenue collection in the county. Representatives are elected from county districts, serving four-year terms. They are responsible for setting salaries, the annual budget, and special spending. The council also has limited authority to impose local taxes, in the form of an income and property tax that is subject to state level approval, excise taxes, and service taxes.

Board of Commissioners: The Board of Commissioners is the executive body of the county. Commissioners are elected county–wide in staggered four–year terms. One commissioner serves as board president. They are charged with executing the acts legislated by the council, collecting revenue, and managing the day-to-day functions of the county government.

County Officials: The county has several other elected offices, including sheriff, coroner, auditor, treasurer, recorder, surveyor and circuit court clerk. Each of these elected officers serves a term of four years and oversees a different part of county government. Members elected to county government positions are required to declare party affiliations and to be residents of the county.

State Government: At the State level, Ripley County is divided in its representation. Adams and Laughery Townships are located in the 55th House District which is represented by Rep. Cindy Ziemke.  The rest of Ripley County is located in the 67th district represented by Rep. Randy Frye. Adams and Laughery Townships are in the 42nd Senate District represented by State Senator Jean Leising. The rest of Ripley County is in Senate District 43 represented by Senator Chip Perfect.

Federal Government:
Ripley County is part of Indiana's 6th congressional district and is represented in Congress by Republican Greg Pence. Along with the rest of Indiana, its senators are Mike Braun and Todd Young.

Demographics

As of the 2010 United States Census, there were 28,818 people, 10,789 households, and 7,910 families residing in the county. The racial makeup of the county was 97.6% white, 0.5% Asian, 0.2% American Indian, 0.2% black or African American, 0.5% from other races, and 0.9% from two or more races. Those of Hispanic or Latino origin made up 1.5% of the population. In terms of ancestry, 43.4% were German, 14.2% were American, 13.9% were Irish, and 8.7% were English.

Of the 10,789 households, 36.2% had children under the age of 18 living with them, 58.1% were married couples living together, 10.2% had a female householder with no husband present, 26.7% were non-families, and 22.8% of all households were made up of individuals. The average household size was 2.63 and the average family size was 3.08. The median age was 39.2 years.

The median income for a household in the county was $47,697 and the median income for a family was $57,305. Males had a median income of $41,711 versus $31,927 for females. The per capita income for the county was $22,025. About 7.5% of families and 9.8% of the population were below the poverty line, including 14.3% of those under age 18 and 8.6% of those age 65 or over.

See also
 List of counties in Indiana
 National Register of Historic Places listings in Ripley County, Indiana
 - Ripley County website
 Ripley County in Indiana portal

References

External links
 Ripley County, Indiana collection, Rare Books and Manuscripts, Indiana State Library

 
Indiana counties
1818 establishments in Indiana
Populated places established in 1818